Ett julkort från förr is a 2000 Christer Sjögren Christmas album, released to CD and cassette tape. At the album charts, it peaked at number three in Sweden and number 19 in Norway between 2000–2002.

Track listing
Nu tändas tusen juleljus
Natten tänder ljus på himlen
Stilla natt (Stille Nacht, heilige Nacht)
The Christmas Song
När juldagsmorgon glimmar
Advent
Ett julkort från förr (An Old Christmas Card)
Det brinner ett ljus för en gammal sång
Härlig är Jorden (Dejlig er Jorden)
I'll Be Home for Christmas
Barnet i Betlehem (Mary's Boy Child)
När i kväll jag tänder ett ljus
Säg, vem är han? (What Child is this?)
Glory, Glory Halleluja (An American Trilogy)

Contributors
Christer Sjögren – vocals
Rutger Gunnarsson – guitar
Lasse Wellander – guitar
Lasse Persson – drums
Per Lindvall – drums
Peter Ljung – keyboard

Charts

References 

2000 Christmas albums
Christmas albums by Swedish artists
Christer Sjögren albums
Pop rock Christmas albums
Swedish-language albums